Daughters-Mothers is a 1974 Soviet drama film directed by Sergey Gerasimov.

Plot 
The film tells about a girl who grew up in an orphanage, not knowing her own mother. And suddenly she receives an old letter that her mother wrote many years ago, and she decides to go to Moscow to meet her mother.

Cast 
 Innokentiy Smoktunovsky as Vadim Antonovich Vasilyev
 Tamara Makarova as Yelena Alekseyevna Vasilyeva
 Sergey Gerasimov as Pyotr Vorobyov
 Lyubov Polekhina as Olga Vasileyeva
 Svetlana Smekhnova as Anya Vasilyeva
 Larisa Udovichenko as Galya Vasilyeva
 Zura Kipshidze as Rezo
 Boris Bachurin
 Lyubov Kalyuzhnaya
 Ye. Kasatikova
 Valentina Khmara as Natasha (as V. Khmara)

References

External links 
 

1974 films
1970s Russian-language films
Soviet drama films
1974 drama films